The discography of the Canadian post-hardcore band Silverstein consists of 11 studio albums, one live album, six extended plays and one compilation album.

Studio albums

Compilation albums

Live albums

Extended plays

Singles

Other appearances

Music videos

References

Discographies of Canadian artists
Post-hardcore group discographies
Discography